Florian Stritzel (born 31 January 1994) is a German professional footballer who plays as a goalkeeper for SV Wehen Wiesbaden.

References

External links
 

1994 births
Living people
People from Neubrandenburg
German footballers
Germany youth international footballers
Association football goalkeepers
1. FC Neubrandenburg 04 players
Hamburger SV II players
Karlsruher SC II players
Karlsruher SC players
SV Darmstadt 98 players
SV Wehen Wiesbaden players
2. Bundesliga players
3. Liga players
Regionalliga players
Footballers from Mecklenburg-Western Pomerania